Neal Acree (born July 11, 1974) is an American composer of film, television, and video game music. He has scored 30 feature films, contributed music to the popular Blizzard Entertainment video game franchises StarCraft II, World of Warcraft,  Diablo III, Overwatch, as well as the Chinese MMO Revelation Online.  His television work includes the series Stargate SG-1,  Stargate Atlantis, Witchblade and the first season of Sanctuary.

Awards
Best Sound and Music Editing - Overwatch: Honor and Glory - MPSE Golden Reel Awards (2018)
Composer of the Year - Massively Overpowered Online VGM Awards (2016)
Best Expansion Score - World of Warcraft: Warlords of Draenor - Massively Overpowered Online VGM Awards (2016)
Best Soundtrack - Revelation Online - MMOSite Readers Choice Awards (2016)
Best Music, Video Game - Overwatch - Hollywood Music in Media Awards (2016)
Composer of the Year - BSOSpirit Jerry Goldsmith Awards Awards (2016)
Best Music, Video Game - Revelation Online - BSOSpirit Jerry Goldsmith Awards Awards (2016)
Best Music, Video Game - Revelation Online - Scorecast Genius Choice Vote (2015)
Best Cinematic/Cutscene Audio - StarCraft II: Legacy of the Void - Game Audio Network Guild Awards (2015)
Best Music, Visual Media - World of Warcraft: Warlords of Draenor - Hollywood Music in Media Awards (2015)
Best Sound and Music Editing - StarCraft II: Heart of the Swarm - MPSE Golden Reel Awards (2014)
Award of Merit: Soundtrack (Motion Picture) - Assassination Games - Global Music Awards (2013)
Award of Merit: Soundtrack (Video Game) - World of Warcraft: Mists of Pandaria - Global Music Awards (2013)
Best Music, Game - World of Warcraft: Mists of Pandaria - Scorecast Cue Awards (2013)
Best Music, Visual Media - Diablo III - Hollywood Music in Media Awards (2012)
Audio of the Year - Diablo III - Game Audio Network Guild Awards (2012)
Best Audio - Diablo III - Game Developer's Choice Online Awards (2012)
Best Cinematic/Cutscene Audio - StarCraft II: Wings of Liberty - Game Audio Network Guild Awards (2011)
Best Vocal (Choral) - World of Warcraft: Cataclysm (lyrics by) - Game Audio Network Guild Awards (2011)
Best Cinematic/Cutscene Audio - World of Warcraft: Wrath of the Lich King - Game Audio Network Guild Awards (2009)
Best Use of Music - World of Warcraft: The Burning Crusade - Telly Awards (2007)

Nominations
Video Game Score of the Year - StarCraft II: Legacy of the Void - ASCAP Composer's Choice Awards (2015)
Best Original Score for a Video Game - Revelation Online - International Film Music Critics Association Awards (2015)
Best Instrumental: The Chosen - Main Theme from - Revelation Online - Game Audio Network Guild Awards (2015)
Best Video Game Score - Revelation Online - Movie Music UK Awards (2015)
Best Interactive Game Score - Revelation Online - Reel Music Awards (2015)
Best Music, Game - StarCraft II: Legacy of the Void - Soundtrack Geek Awards (2015)
Best Original Score for a Video Game - World of Warcraft: Warlords of Draenor - International Film Music Critics Association Awards (2014)
Best Music: Visual Media - Diablo III - Hollywood Music In Media Awards (2012)
Outstanding Music Composition - World of Warcraft: Cataclysm - Interactive Achievement Awards (2011)
Outstanding Music Composition - StarCraft II: Wings of Liberty - Interactive Achievement Awards (2011)
Best Cinematic/Cutscene Audio - World of Warcraft: Cataclysm - Game Audio Network Guild Awards (2011)
Music of the Year - World of Warcraft: Wrath of the Lich King - Game Audio Network Guild Awards (2009)
Soundtrack of the Year - World of Warcraft: Wrath of the Lich King - Game Audio Network Guild Awards (2009)
Outstanding Music Composition - World of Warcraft: Wrath of the Lich King - Interactive Achievement Awards (2009)

Video game music
 World of Warcraft: Shadowlands (2020)
 Rend (2019)
 Wangzhe Rongyao: Chuzheng (2019)
 World of Warcraft: Battle for Azeroth (2018)
 World of Warcraft: Legion (2016)
 Overwatch (2016)
 StarCraft II: Legacy of the Void (2015)
 Imperial Reign (2015)
 Revelation Online (2015)
 World of Warcraft: Warlords of Draenor (2014)
 Diablo III: Reaper of Souls (2014)
 Starcraft II: Heart of the Swarm (2013)
 World of Warcraft: Mists of Pandaria (2012)
 Diablo III (2012)
 World of Warcraft: Cataclysm (2010)
 StarCraft II: Wings of Liberty (2010)
 World of Warcraft: Wrath of the Lich King (opening cinematic) (2008)
 World of Warcraft: The Burning Crusade (opening cinematic) (2006)

Television music
Sanctuary (first season)
Stargate Atlantis
Stargate SG-1
Stargate Universe
Witchblade
The Legend of Vox Machina

Film music
Animal World (2018)
The Saint (2017)
Falcon Rising starring Michael Jai White (2014)
Six Bullets starring Jean-Claude Van Damme (2012)
Assassination Games starring Jean-Claude Van Damme (2011)
War of the Dead (2011)
Witchville (2011)
The Mechanic starring Jason Statham (additional music) (2010)
Hallowed Ground (2008)
Stargate: Continuum (additional music) (2008)
Stargate: The Ark of Truth (additional music) (2008)
Juncture (2007)
Throttle (2005)
Crash Landing (2005)
7 Seconds (2005)
Cerberus (2005)
Gargoyle: Wings of Darkness (2004)
Method (film) (2004)
The Curse of the Komodo (2004)
Deadly Swarm (2003)
Lost Treasure (2003)
Project Viper (2002)
Gale Force (2002)
Venomous (2001)
Ablaze (2001)
Critical Mass (2001)
They Crawl (2001)
Crash Point Zero (2001)
Militia (2000)

Notes

External links

1974 births
American film score composers
American television composers
Living people
American male film score composers
Male television composers
People from Tarzana, Los Angeles
Video game composers